The UK Singles Chart is one of many music charts compiled by the Official Charts Company that calculates the best-selling singles of the week in the United Kingdom. Before 2004, the chart was only based on the sales of physical singles with airplay figures and digital downloads excluded from the official chart. This list shows singles that peaked in the Top 10 of the UK Singles Chart during 2000, as well as singles which peaked in 1999 but were in the top 10 in 2000. The entry date is when the song appeared in the top 10 for the first time (week ending, as published by the Official Charts Company, which is six days after the chart is announced).

Two hundred and twenty-three singles were in the top ten in 2000. Thirteen singles from 1999 remained in the top 10 for several weeks at the beginning of the year. "Mr Hankey the Christmas Poo" by Mr Hankey, "Two in a Million"/"You're My Number One" by S Club 7 and "Say You'll Be Mine"/"Better the Devil You Know" by Steps were the singles from 1999 to reach their peak in 2000. Forty-nine artists scored multiple entries in the top 10 in 2000. Blink-182, Coldplay,
Nelly, Pink and Sia were among the many artists who achieved their first UK charting top 10 single in 2000.

The 1999 Christmas number-one, "I Have a Dream"/"Seasons in the Sun" by Westlife, remained at number-one for the first three weeks of 2000. The first new number-one single of the year was "The Masses Against the Classes" by Welsh band Manic Street Preachers. Overall, forty-three different singles peaked at number-one in 2000, with Westlife (4) having the most singles hit that position.

Background

Multiple entries
Two hundred and twenty-three singles charted in 2000, with 213 singles reaching their peak this year.

Forty-nine artists scored multiple entries in the top 10 in 2000. British singer-songwriter and rapper Craig David and Irish group Westlife shared the record for the most top ten singles in 2000 with five entries. The most successful of these were "Fill Me In" and 7 Days", which both reached the top of the chart. His other solo single that year, "Walking Away" peaked two places lower at number 3. David had two hit singles in collaboration with Artful Dodger - "Re-Rewind" charted at number 2 in the last weeks of 1999 and remained in the top ten throughout January 2000, while "Woman Trouble" reached a high of number six. Artful Dodger had two further top 10 singles without David, namely the number 2 hit "Movin' Too Fast (with Romina Johnson) and "Please Don't Turn Me On" featuring Lifford, peaking in fourth spot.

Westlife saw all but one of their singles in 2000 reach number-one, beginning with "I Have a Dream"/"Seasons in the Sun", the 1999 Christmas number-one. "Fool Again" repeated the feat in April, and their duet with Mariah Carey - "Against All Odds" - did the same in September. "My Love" became their fourth chart topper of the year in November and "What Makes a Man" peaked one place lower in December 2000.

Britney Spears, Eminem, Kylie Minogue, S Club 7 and Steps also had four hit singles in 2000. Spears had two number-one singles - "Born to Make You Happy and "Oops!... I Did It Again" - among her top ten entries, which were rounded off by "Lucky" (number 5) and "Stronger" (7). Steps took "Stomp" to the top of the charts and also appeared in the top ten with "Say You'll Be Mine"/"Better the Devil You Know" and "Deeper Shade of Blue" (both number four) and "When I Said Goodbye/Summer of Love", which reached number five.

Christina Aguilera achieved two more hit singles in 2000. Among her top ten entries where ”What a Girl Wants”(#3) and "Come On Over Baby (All I Want Is You)" (#8).

Pop group S Club 7's hit singles in 2000 included the chart-topping Children in Need single "Never Had a Dream Come True", number two entries "Reach" and "Two in a Million"/"You're My Number One", and "Natural which peaked one place lower. Rapper Eminem had two number one singles - "The Real Slim Shady" and the duet with Dido, "Stan". He also placed in the top ten with his Dr. Dre collaboration "Forgot About Dre"  (number seven) and solo single "The Way I Am" at number eight.

Australian singer Minogue's biggest hit of the year was July's "Spinning Around" which spent a week at the top. Her other entries were "On a Night Like This", missing out on being her second number one of the year by one position, and "Please Stay", a single week in tenth spot. Her fourth single to chart was "Kids" at the end of the year with Robbie Williams - the song peaked at number one.

Spice Girls member Melanie C was one of a number of artists with three top-ten entries, including number-one solo single "I Turn to You" and "Holler"/"Let Love Lead the Way" with the group, which also reached the top spot. A1, Destiny's Child, Oasis, Sonique and Vengaboys were among the other artists who had multiple top 10 entries in 2000.

Chart debuts
Ninety-one artists achieved their first top 10 single in 2000, either as a lead or featured artist. Of these, eleven went on to record another hit single that year: Coldplay, Darude, Dr. Dre, Madison Avenue, Oxide & Neutrino, Pink, Richard Blackwood, Santana, Scooch, Sisqó and True Steppers. DJ Luck & MC Neat and Sonique both had two other entries in their breakthrough year.

The following table (collapsed on desktop site) does not include acts who had previously charted as part of a group and secured their first top 10 solo single. 

Notes
Rebecca Wheatley was part of the Casualty cast who covered "Everlasting Love" in 1998, peaking at number five. "Stay With Me (Baby)" was her first and, to date, only single as a solo artist. Richard Ashcroft" had previous chart success with The Verve, including number-one "Bittersweet Symphony"; his 2000 single "A Song for the Lovers" marked his solo debut. Dane Bowers was a member of "Another Level", recording seven top 10 singles prior to his featured credits on the True Steppers songs "Out of Your Mind" (also featuring Victoria Beckham, who achieved her first top 10 away from Spice Girls) and "Buggin".

Watergate was another alias of Orhan Terzi, also known as DJ Quicksilver, who reached number 4 with "Bellissima" in 1997. Prior to 2000 Stephen Gately had sixteen top 10 singles with his band Boyzone, and "New Beginning"/"Bright Eyes" marked his first entry in his own right.

Songs from films
Original songs from various films entered the top 10 throughout the year. These included "The Great Beyond" (from Man on the Moon), "Pure Shores" (The Beach), "Try Again" (Romeo Must Die), "Take a Look Around" (Mission: Impossible 2), "Doesn't Really Matter" (Nutty Professor II: The Klumps), "Can't Fight the Moonlight" (Coyote Ugly) and "Independent Women" (Charlie's Angels).

Charity singles
S Club 7 recorded the Children in Need single, "Never Had a Dream Come True" which topped the chart for one week on 9 December 2000. It was the band's sixth top 10 single and their second number one, their first since their debut "Bring It All Back" in 1999.

Best-selling singles
Bob the Builder, the children's TV character voiced by Neil Morrissey, had the best-selling single of the year with "Can We Fix It?". The song spent six weeks in the top 10, including 3 at number one, sold over 850,000 copies and was certified platinum by the BPI. "Pure Shores" by All Saints came in second place, selling more than 685,000 copies and losing out by around 165,000 sales. Sonique's "It Feels So Good", "Who Let the Dogs Out?" from Baha Men, and "Rock DJ by Robbie Williams made up the top five. Singles by Eminem featuring Dido, Fragma, Spiller S Club 7 and Craig David were also in the top ten best-selling singles of the year.

"Can We Fix It?" (10) was also ranked in the top 10 best-selling singles of the decade.

Top-ten singles

Entries by artist

The following table shows artists who achieved two or more top 10 entries in 2000, including singles that reached their peak in 1999. The figures include both main artists and featured artists, while appearances on ensemble charity records are also counted for each artist. The total number of weeks an artist spent in the top ten in 2000 is also shown.

Notes

 "Back In My Life" re-entered the top 10 at number 10 on 1 January 2000 (week ending).
 "Barber's Adagio for Strings" re-entered the top 10 at number 7 on 15 January 2000 (week ending) for two weeks.
 "Steal My Sunshine" re-entered the top 10 at number 9 on 15 January 2000 (week ending) for two weeks.
 "Imagine" was first released as a single in the UK in 1975 and made the top 10, peaking at number 6. Following John Lennon's death in December 1980, it re-entered the top 10 and spent four weeks at number one in January 1981.
 "Don't Call Me Baby" peaked at number 30 in 1999.
 "It Feels So Good" peaked at number 26 in 1998.
 "The Power of Love" was first released in 1984 and spent one week at number-one It was re-released in 1993 and made the top 10 for a second time, peaking at number 10.
 The original version of "Silence" (without Sarah McLachlan) peaked at number 73 in 1999.
 "Operation Blade" re-entered the top 10 at number 10 on 6 January 2001 (week ending).
 Released as the official single for Children in Need.
 "I Put a Spell on You" peaked at number 36 in 1998.
 Bob the Builder was voiced by Neil Morrissey.
 "Stronger" re-entered the top 10 at number 10 on 6 January 2001 (week ending).
 Figure includes song that peaked in 1999.
 Figure includes appearances on Artful Dodger's "Re-Rewind" and "Woman Trouble".
 Figure includes appearance on Dr. Dre's "Forgot About Dre".
 Figure includes song that first charted in 1999 but peaked in 2000.
 Figure includes a top 10 hit with the group Spice Girls.
 Figure includes appearance on True Steppers' "Buggin".

See also
2000 in British music
List of number-one singles from the 2000s (UK)

References
General

Specific

External links
2000 singles chart archive at the Official Charts Company (click on relevant week)

2000 record charts
2000 in British music
2000